Netta Schreiber (born 6 November 1998) is an Israeli retired competitive figure skater. She competed at the 2014 and 2015 World Championships.

Personal life 
Schreiber was born in Tel Aviv, Israel on 6 November 1998. When she was four years old, she moved with her family to Rye, New York. Her mother is a yoga instructor.

Career 
Schreiber competed at the 2014 World Championships in Saitama, Japan; she placed 33rd in the short program. She was coached by Gilberto Viadana in Elmsford, United States, until the end of the 2013–14 figure skating season.

In mid-2014, Schreiber moved to Toronto, Canada to train at the Toronto Cricket, Skating and Curling Club under Ernest Pryhitka. She placed 30th at the 2015 World Championships in Shanghai, China.

Programs

Competitive highlights 
CS: Challenger Series; JGP: Junior Grand Prix

References

External links
 

1998 births
Living people
Israeli female single skaters